The 2020–21 season is Victoria Libertas Pesaro's 75th in existence and the club's 13th consecutive season in the top tier Italian basketball.

Overview 
After the disastrous 2019-20 season where they ended at the last place before the official interruption of the championship due to the coronavirus pandemic, they had a serious risk of being relegated to the Serie A2. But, at the last moment, the management decided to keep the team in the Serie A.

Kit 
Supplier: Erreà / Sponsor: Prosciutto Carpegna DOP

Players

Current roster

Depth chart

Squad changes

In

|}

Out

|}

Confirmed 

|}

From youth team 

|}

Coach

Competitions

Supercup

Italian Cup 
Pesaro qualified to the 2021 Italian Basketball Cup by ending the first half of the LBA season in the 6th position. They played the quarterfinal against the 3rd ranking Banco di Sardegna Sassari. They reached the final but lost against AX Armani Exchange Milano.

Serie A

See also 

 2020–21 LBA season
 2021 Italian Basketball Cup
 2020 Italian Basketball Supercup

References 

2020–21 in Italian basketball by club